Holly is a fictional character in the science fiction situation comedy Red Dwarf. The character, who is the eponymous spaceship's onboard computer, has been played by Norman Lovett (series I-II, VII-VIII, XII, The Promised Land) and Hattie Hayridge (series III-V).

Actors
The character was played by Norman Lovett in Series I and II. In series III the character had a "head sex change" and was played by Hattie Hayridge. Hayridge played the part of Holly from Series III–V. Holly did not appear in Series VI, but reappeared in the Series VII finale as the original male version, again played by Lovett. The male version of Holly appeared throughout Series VIII, but does not appear in Red Dwarf: Back to Earth, Series X, or Series XI. Lovett reprised the role for the final episode of Series XII and has appeared in the role again in an extended special episode The Promised Land in 2020. Doug Naylor also revealed on Twitter that Lovett's return was permanent for any future series or specials.

In the unaired pilot for the American version of Red Dwarf, Holly was played by Jane Leeves.

Appearance
Holly is an "intelligent" computer. Holly's user interface appears on ship screens as a disembodied human head on a black background, and can also be downloaded into a watch worn by Lister, Kryten's chest display, and on a motorcycle speedometer when the crew visited Waxworld. In Series I his face appears pixelated, but this idea was dropped in Series II. As a male, Holly appears to be approximately 50 years old and has receding brown hair.

After meeting his female counterpart, Hilly, in the series 2 episode Parallel Universe he fell so madly in love with her that he had a "computer sex change" and based his new face on hers. As a female, Holly appears to be approximately 30 years old and has shoulder-length blonde hair and red lipstick.

In series VII–VIII, the upgraded male version of Holly appears to be around 60 years old with receding grey hair and a bald patch.

In 'Skipper', the final episode of Series XII, Holly re-appears in a brief appearance when Rimmer travels to a point in time where the crew are about to be killed by the radiation leak as demonstrated in The End. He appears to be approximately 70 years old, has less hair than his previous appearances and that hair has become more grey.

Character
Holly is the ship's Tenth Generation AI hologrammatic computer. After releasing Dave Lister from stasis in The End, Holly told him that the crew have been wiped out by a radiation leak and that he had spent three million years in stasis. Holly prides himself on the fact he had an IQ of 6,000, but after three million years by himself, he had become computer senile, or as Holly put it, "a bit peculiar". The crew often ridicule Holly on his senility, but Holly often comes out on top. He often plays practical jokes on the crew, such as fooling Lister into thinking that NORWEB Federation space fighters were after him and wanted £180 billion in arrears for leaving his bathroom light on three million years ago, as well as wanting to arrest him for "Crimes against Humanity" as he had left some mouldy German sausages alone in his apartment for three million years and now the mould covered 7/8 of the Earth's surface. This love of practical jokes culminated in his generating an alternate personality, Queeg, and passing him off as the ship's backup computer which was seizing control of the ship; Holly's Queeg persona is portrayed by Charles Augins in the episode.

Holly always speaks in a droll, slightly monotonous, and quiet voice, even when sounding alarms, which consist of himself speaking simply "Ding-dong. There's an emergency going on. (pauses) It's still going on." and repeating as much. He often greets the crew with "All right dudes?"

Among his achievements was the invention of Hol Rock, where he decimalised music (having ten notes instead of eight—although he admits that this would result in "piano keyboards being the width of a zebra crossing, and women being banned from playing the cello"). He also wrote an A-Z guide of the Universe.

He was friends with another computer called Gordon, who had an IQ of 8,000 and was an Eleventh Generation AI hologrammatic computer. Gordon resembled Holly in that he was represented as a balding middle-aged man.  Despite having a higher IQ than Holly, Gordon showed a lesser understanding of technology than Holly. One of the more worrying aspects of Holly's senility is that he has developed a blind spot for the number 7. When he invents the Holly Hop Drive, he claims that one mistake in his 13 billion calculations and they would be blown up. He then misses the seven in his countdown, possibly the cause of the error that sent them to the parallel universe.

Holly runs most of Red Dwarf'''s systems, although in several episodes such as Quarantine, Holly is shown to not have complete control of Red Dwarf, and in Holly's absence in Series VI and VII, a computer is mentioned by the crew, and is seen to control autopilot.

Holly was lost for some time, along with the ship, which had been stolen by Kryten's nanobots. He was found on a planet made of junk from Red Dwarf, having reverted to his original male form, and was downloaded into Lister's Holly-watch. When the nanobots rebuilt the ship, there were two versions of Holly: the original, who usually remains in the watch, and a rebuilt version who had not suffered the effects of three million years alone. The non-senile version only appeared in one episode, Back in the Red, Part III, and was distinguished by having an enormous forehead shaped like an egg. The original Holly then states that he was responsible for re-engineering the Nanobots to resurrect the dead crew, all for the purposes of distracting Lister from going insane.

In Red Dwarf: Back to Earth it is revealed that sometime after the events of Only The Good... Holly is offline due to water damage, later elaborated as being the result of Lister leaving a bath running in the officers' quarters for nine years and the water subsequently flooding the ship.

Kryten briefly mentions Holly in the series X episode Fathers and Suns, saying that the crew "miss" him before installing Pree, another computer.

Holly made a return appearance in the final episode of Series XII ("Skipper"), once again played by Lovett. This version of Holly was still senile but located in an alternate universe which Rimmer enters, set just before the crew are wiped out by the radiation leak.

In Red Dwarf: The Promised Land, Lister discovers Holly's back-up personality disc and uses it to reactivate him, but the 'new' Holly, although once again smart, begins steps to destroy the ship as he concludes it is no longer fulfilling a worthwhile function for the company. Temporarily retreating to Starbug, the crew are eventually able to trick the new Holly into downloading the experiences of the original from the Red Dwarf'' archives, which restores his senility but also his old personality, prompting him to help them reclaim the ship from the rogue Cats.

References

External links
Podcast ending with an interview with Hattie Hayridge (Holly the computer) contains anecdotes about Red Dwarf and about how she got selected to play the computer
Article on, and interview with, the two actors who portrayed Holly

Fictional artificial intelligences
Television characters introduced in 1988
Fictional computers
Red Dwarf characters
Fictional LGBT characters in television